The 1911 Paris–Tours was the eighth edition of the Paris–Tours cycle race and was held on 2 April 1911. The race started in Paris and finished in Tours. The race was won by Octave Lapize.

General classification

References

1911 in French sport
1911
April 1911 sports events
April 1911 events in Europe